Gualterius de Lavendel was an ambassador of the king Charles II of Anjou to the Mongol ruler Ghazan. He went to Persia to visit Ghazan, and arrived there after 27 April 1303. The embassy followed the 1302 Peace of Caltabellotta which ended the conflict between Anjou and Aragon in the Mediterranean.

Notes

References
Sylvia Schein, Gesta Dei per Mongolos 1300, The English Historical Review, 1979

Year of birth missing
Year of death missing
Ambassadors to the Mongol Empire
14th-century French people
14th-century diplomats